Makuch, Makúch, or Makukh are surnames. Makuch and alternatives may refer to:

 Dirk Schulze-Makuch (born 1964), American astrobiologist
 Jozef Makúch (born 1953), Former governor of the National Bank of Slovakia
 Marcin Makuch (born 1980), Polish footballer
 Rudolf Macúch (1919–1993), Slovak linguist
 Vasyl Makukh (1927–1968), Ukrainian activist
 Wanda Makuch-Korulska (1919–2007), Polish neurologist

See also
 

Polish-language surnames
Slovak-language surnames
Ukrainian-language surnames